is a passenger railway station in located in the city of Yokosuka, Kanagawa, Japan, operated by East Japan Railway Company (JR East).

Lines
Taura Station is served by the Yokosuka Line. It is located 13.8 km from Ōfuna Station, and 63.2 km from the Tokyo Station.

Station layout
The station consists of two tracks and a single island platform connected to the station building by a footbridge. The station is located in a valley between two tunnels. Because of this, the usable length of the platform is short, necessitating use of a selective door operation system for longer trains. Specifically, the doors of the first car, and the first door of the next car of 11-car trains stopping at the station will not open. For that, Yokosuka Line cars (E217 series and E235 series) are equipped with a switch for keeping the doors shut, and there are warning stickers on the doors that do not open.

There is an over-track station building, with exits on either side of the overpass, and ticket gates in the middle. In March 2010, elevators were installed between the concourse (inside the ticket gates) and platform, and between the station building (outside the ticket gates) and the exits. A multi-function toilet was also built.

The roof over the platform was built during World War II, and it supports are a mixture of wood and rail iron, even today.

Platforms

History
Taura Station opened on May 1, 1904 as a station on the Japanese Government Railways (JGR), the pre-war predecessor to the Japanese National Railways (JNR). The spur line from Ōfuna to serve the Yokosuka Naval Arsenal and related Imperial Japanese Navy facilities at Yokosuka was renamed the Yokosuka Line in October 1909. The station came under the management of JR East upon the privatization of JNR on April 1, 1987.

Passenger statistics
In fiscal 2019, the station was used by an average of 2,232 passengers daily (boarding passengers only).

The passenger figures (boarding passengers only) for previous years are as shown below.

Surrounding area
 Nagaura Port
 JMSDF Yokosuka Hospital

See also
List of railway stations in Japan

References

External links

 JR East Station information (JR East) 

Railway stations in Japan opened in 1904
Yokosuka Line
Railway stations in Yokosuka, Kanagawa
Stations of East Japan Railway Company